Brahim Ben Bouilla (born 29 November 1959) is a Moroccan former road cyclist. He competed in the individual road race event at the 1984 Summer Olympics.

References

External links
 

1959 births
Living people
Moroccan male cyclists
Olympic cyclists of Morocco
Cyclists at the 1984 Summer Olympics
Sportspeople from Marrakesh